MCMV may refer to:
 1905 (in Roman numerals)
 Mine countermeasures vessel
 Two viruses:
 Mouse cytomegalovirus
 Maize chlorotic mottle virus